Erica Terwillegar (born April 8, 1963) is an American luger. She competed at the 1988 Winter Olympics and the 1992 Winter Olympics.

References

External links
 

1963 births
Living people
American female lugers
Olympic lugers of the United States
Lugers at the 1988 Winter Olympics
Lugers at the 1992 Winter Olympics
People from Nelsonville, Ohio
21st-century American women